Selling Yoga : from Counterculture to Pop culture is a 2015 book on the modern practice of yoga as exercise by the scholar of religion, Andrea R. Jain.

Background

Since Elizabeth De Michelis's 2004 A History of Modern Yoga and Mark Singleton's 2010 book Yoga Body, the origins of the modern practice of yoga as exercise have been debated by scholars of religion. Singleton examined its origins in the physical culture of India in the early 20th century.

Andrea Jain is a scholar of South Asian Religions and yoga at the Indiana University School of Liberal Arts. She gained her bachelor's degree in 2004 at Southern Methodist University; and then a master's degree in 2009, a graduate certificate in the study of women, gender, and sexuality in 2010, and her PhD that same year, all at Rice University. She is editor of the Journal of the American Academy of Religion.  She contributed the essay on modern yoga to the Oxford Research Encyclopedia of Religion. In 2015 she published the book Selling Yoga : from Counterculture to Pop culture.

Book

Synopsis

Jain prefaces the book with a personal note in which she explains how she came to research the subject, and records that despite her name she is not a practising Jain.

The book is introduced with an account of premodern yoga systems. It then examines the role of yoga in western counterculture, and its relationship to consumer culture. It examines with worked examples the branding and commercialisation of modern yoga. It then analyses the extent to which modern (postural) yoga can be seen as a body of religious practice. Finally, it looks at the debate between the yogaphobia seen for example in some branches of Christianity, and the Hindu nationalist claim that modern yoga has Hindu origins; Jain illustrates the weaknesses in both types of claim.

The book is illustrated with a small number of monochrome photographs.

There is an academic bibliography and a detailed index.

Reception

The anthropologist Joseph Alter, reviewing Selling Yoga in Nova Religio, writes that the book is about much more than just the selling of yoga, covering in "a carefully argued and exceptionally sensitive and insightful account" both yoga's combination of the body, spirituality, and branding, and the interaction of politics with "the embodied fetishization of cultural heritage and identity."

Maya Warrier, reviewing the book in the Journal of American Studies, writes that Jain "decisively counters the notion that there is such a thing as an 'authentic' form of yoga", arguing instead that yoga has always been "polymorphous and adaptable", among other things, fitting into Hindu, Buddhist, and Jain traditions. Warrier notes that Jain's account of early Western "entrepreneur-yogis" like Ida C. Craddock, Pierre Bernard, and Sir John Woodroffe were all countercultural, appealing to westerners with "unorthodox" religious views.

Jaime Kucinskas, reviewing the book for Sociology of Religion, notes that there has been confusion, even amongst academics, as to what yoga is and where the modern form of it came from, and states that the book "provides important and insightful answers" to these questions. Kucinskas writes that Jain describes "contemporary postural yoga" as "a new product that formed through dialogical interactions between Indians and Westerners from the nineteenth century to the present", building in "transnational cultural elements" like military callisthenics and modern medicine.

Kimberley J. Pingatore, reviewing the book for Religion, writes that Jain "challenges the notion that all yogas exist as part of a monolithic, unbroken lineage... [and] convincingly locates [modern postural yoga]'s recent popularization in Europe and the United States as part of capitalist consumer culture", arguing that Jain then makes use of this consumer centre of gravity to attack the argument that this yoga belongs to non-Westerners. Pingatore finds Jain's first two chapters "brilliantly" summarize the research of the major scholars of yoga including David Gordon White, Joseph Alter, Christopher Key Chapple, Mark Singleton, Sarah Strauss, Elizabeth De Michelis, and Hugh Urban. Pingatore argues, too, that Jain "ferociously" deconstructs the East/West, Us/Them dichotomised understanding, in Chapter 3 showing that modern yoga systems grew "in response to transnational [consumer] cultural developments". On the other hand, Pingatore observes that while Jain argues that modern yoga defies attempts at definition or regulation, and disagrees that it is spiritual, she claims that it is a "body of religious practice". Pingatore remarks the absence of gender in Jain's account, writing that this is surprising given that yoga practitioners are predominantly female, young, affluent, fit, and white.

References

Sources

External links

2015 non-fiction books
Sociology books
Sociology of religion
Modern yoga books
Yoga scholars
Oxford University Press books